MG4 may refer to:
MG4, Heckler & Koch firearm
MG4, British NVC community category  
 MG4 (album)
 MG4 EV, an electric car